Twarog may refer to:

People:
Betty Twarog (1927–2013), American biochemist 
Michał Twaróg of Bystrzyków (1450–1520), Polish philosopher and theologian 

Other:
Twaróg (in Polish) and tvorog (in Russian), local names for the dairy product known as Quark
22791 Twarog, a minor planet. See List of minor planets: 22001–23000